was the son of Soga no Emishi, a statesman in the Asuka Period of Japan.

He was assassinated at court in a coup d'état involving Nakatomi no Kamatari and Prince Naka-no-Ōe (see: Isshi Incident), who accused him of trying to murder Prince Yamashiro, a charge which Soga no Iruka denied. Soga no Emishi also committed suicide soon after his son's death, and the main branch of the Soga clan became extinct. Prince Naka-no-Oe later ascended the throne as Emperor Tenji, and Nakatomi no Kamatari was promoted and given the name Fujiwara no Kamatari.

Legacy
In 2005, the remains of a building which may have been Soga no Iruka's residence were discovered in Nara.  This discovery appeared to be consistent with the description found in Nihon Shoki.

Popular culture
 Portrayed by Jung Jin-gak in the 2012-2013 KBS1 TV series Dream of the Emperor.

References

645 deaths
Soga clan
People of Asuka-period Japan
Year of birth unknown
Deified Japanese people
Assassinated Japanese politicians